Robert O. Davis (July 15, 1910 – July 1, 1992) was a Republican member of the Pennsylvania House of Representatives.

Life
Born in New Castle, Pennsylvania on July 15, 1910, Davis attended Pennsylvania State University, where he was a member of Sigma Pi fraternity.

He died in Beaver, Pennsylvania on July 1, 1992.

References

Republican Party members of the Pennsylvania House of Representatives
1910 births
1992 deaths
20th-century American politicians